Kevin Higgins (born December 1, 1955) is an American football coach.  On December 16, 2013, he resigned his position as head football coach at The Citadel to accept an assistant head coach position at Wake Forest.   He held The Citadel position from 2005 through 2013. Prior to his position with The Citadel, Higgins was head football coach at Lehigh University from 1994 through 2000.

A native of Emerson, New Jersey, he played football at Emerson Jr./Sr. High School, and coached at his alma mater from 1977 to 1978.

Prior to receiving the head coaching position at Lehigh, Higgins held assistant coaching positions at Gettysburg and Richmond. During the interim between Lehigh and The Citadel, Higgins served as quarterbacks and wide receivers coach for the Detroit Lions of the National Football League.

Coaching career

The Citadel
Following a 7–4 campaign that featured wins over SoCon tri-champs Georgia Southern and Appalachian State, Higgins was named Southern Conference Coach of the Year.  Higgins placed two former Bulldogs in the NFL, WR Andre Roberts and CB Cortez Allen of the Arizona Cardinals and Pittsburgh Steelers, respectively.

Head coaching record

References

External links
 Wake Forest profile

1955 births
Living people
Gettysburg Bullets football coaches
Detroit Lions coaches
Lehigh Mountain Hawks football coaches
Richmond Spiders football coaches
The Citadel Bulldogs football coaches
Wake Forest Demon Deacons football coaches
West Chester Golden Rams football players
People from Emerson, New Jersey